The winners of the 14th Vancouver Film Critics Circle Awards, honoring the best in filmmaking in 2013, were announced on January 8, 2014.

Winners and nominees

International

Canadian

References

2013
2013 film awards
Van
2013 in British Columbia